The Malwathu Oya  ( Malwathu Oya,  Aruvi Aru), at  long, is the second longest river in Sri Lanka. The river originates in the North Central Province of Sri Lanka and enters the sea on the northwest coast, into the Gulf of Mannar, near Vankalai. It is a seasonal river that spans over 164 kilometers through paddy and forest lands, which are used by the inhabitants to cultivate for their survival.

Tributaries
 Kanadara Oya
 Maminiya Oya
 Kadahatu Oya
 Kal Aru
 Narivili Aru

See also
 List of rivers in Sri Lanka

References

Rivers of Sri Lanka
Bodies of water of Mannar District
Gulf of Mannar